Seventeen people have served as Justice Minister of Malta since the office was established in 1962.

Political parties

See also
Government of Malta
Justice ministry
Politics of Malta

Sources
Maltese ministries, etc – Rulers.org

Justice
Justice Ministers
Politicians